Sugianto Sabran is an Indonesian politician and the current governor of Central Kalimantan. As governor, Sabran has been a proponent of the Indonesian future capital proposal per the first President Sukarno's idea of shifting the national capital to Palangka Raya. He's also supported initiatives for food security in the province.

References

1973 births
Living people
People from East Kotawaringin Regency
Dayak people
Indonesian Muslims
Indonesian Democratic Party of Struggle politicians
Members of the People's Representative Council, 2009
Governors of Central Kalimantan